van Graan is a surname. Notable people with the surname include:

 Alcardo van Graan (born 1986), South African footballer
 Johann van Graan (born 1980), South African rugby union coach
 Robbie van Graan (1939–2014), South African cricketer
 Tanya van Graan (born 1983), South African actress